Clarence Hubert Kay (born July 30, 1961) is a former professional American football player. A 6'4", 237-lb. tight end from the University of Georgia, Kay was selected by the Denver Broncos in the 7th round of the 1984 NFL Draft. Kay played in 9 NFL seasons from 1984–1992, all with the Broncos.

Between 1984 and 2006 Kay was arrested at least 12 times.  In 2006 Kay pleaded guilty to harassment from domestic violence, and was sentenced to six months imprisonment.

References

1961 births
Living people
People from Seneca, South Carolina
American football tight ends
Georgia Bulldogs football players
Denver Broncos players